The Wind's Fierce (also known as Revenge of Trinity, Trinity Sees Red and The Wind's Anger) is a 1970 Spanish-Italian western-drama film written and directed by Mario Camus.

Plot
Andalusia, the late nineteenth century. Wealthy landowner Don Antonio hires two assassins, Marcos and Jacobo, to infiltrate a group of peasant revolutionaries and kill the leaders. After falling in love with the rebel Soledad, Marcos has a change of heart and decides to unite with the peasants.

Cast
 
Terence Hill as Marcos
Maria Grazia Buccella as Soledad
Mario Pardo as Jacobo 
Máximo Valverde as  Ramón
Fernando Rey as Don Antonio
Ángel Lombarte as  José
William Layton as  Don Lucas
Manuel Alexandre as  Agustín
Manuel de Blas as  Rafael

Reception
Although set in Spain, this film is often classified as a spaghetti-western due to themes, scenes and settings deliberately evocative of the western genre.

Terence Hill gives a dramatic performance in his last film before attaining international stardom with They Call Me Trinity. After the success of that movie, The Wind's Fierce was re-released in many countries as a "Trinity" sequel and misleadingly marketed as a comedy.

References

External links
 

1970 films
1970 Western (genre) films
Italian Western (genre) films
Spanish Western (genre) films
Spaghetti Western films
Films directed by Mario Camus
1970s Italian films